Manuel Rodriguez (March 2, 1940 – November 28, 2012), better known as Spain or Spain Rodriguez, was an American underground cartoonist who created the character Trashman. His experiences on the road with the motorcycle club, the Road Vultures M.C., provided inspiration for his work, as did his left-wing politics. Strongly influenced by 1950s EC Comics illustrator Wally Wood, Spain pushed Wood's sharp, crisp black shadows and hard-edged black outlines into a more simplified, stylized direction. His work also extended the eroticism of Wood's female characters.

Biography

Early life
Manuel Rodriguez was born March 2, 1940, in Buffalo, New York. He picked up the nickname Spain as a child, when he heard some kids in the neighborhood bragging about their Irish ancestry, and he defiantly claimed Spain was just as good as Ireland. Rodriguez studied at the Silvermine Guild Art School in New Canaan, Connecticut alongside cartoonist M.K. Brown.

Career 

In New York City, during the late 1960s, he became a contributor to the underground newspaper the East Village Other, which published his own comics tabloid, Zodiac Mindwarp (1968). He covered the 1968 Democratic National Convention in Chicago as a reporter for the East Village Other, adventures which were chronicled in My True Story (Fantagraphics Books, 1994). One of his earliest strips, "Manning," featured a hard-boiled, over-the-top cop and was later cited as an influence on the British comics character Judge Dredd.

A co-founder (with Robert Crumb) of the United Cartoon Workers of America, Spain contributed to numerous underground comics in the 1960s–2000s, including San Francisco Comic Book, Young Lust, Arcade, Bijou Funnies, Weirdo, and Harvey Pekar's American Splendor. Spain joined the Zap Comix collective in issue #4 (August 1969), and contributed stories to every issue from then until the comic's demise in 2005. In such classics as Spain's Mean Bitch Thrills (Print Mint, 1971), Spain's women are raunchy, explicitly sexual, and sometimes incorporated macho sadomasochistic themes.

Trashman's first appearance was as a full-page serial in the East Village Other. After moving from New York City to San Francisco in 1970, Spain's Subvert Comics series (1970–1976) featured "three full length Trashman: Agent of the Sixth International stories." Trashman later appeared in such publications as High Times, Heavy Metal, Weirdo, San Francisco magazine, Zap #11-13, and the Fantagraphics anthology Zero Zero #2.

From 1976 to 1998, Spain contributed cover art to more than a dozen issues of the popular pornographic magazine Screw.

Spain drew Salon's continuing graphic story, The Dark Hotel, which ran on the website in 1998–1999. His starkly forceful, naturalistic style perfectly matched Conan Doyle's eerie stories in Sherlock Holmes' Strangest Cases (Word Play Publications, 2001).

Spain's later work included an illustrated biography of Marxist revolutionary Ernesto "Che" Guevara, Che: A Graphic Biography (Verso Books, 2008). Published in several different languages, it was described by cartoonist Art Spiegelman as "brilliant and radical." His history of the California farmworker movement, Farmworker Comix was published posthumously in 2014 by the California Federation of Teachers.

Spain designed several posters for the San Francisco Mime Troupe, a political satirist theatre company.

Rodriguez taught art classes at Mission Cultural Center for Latino Arts for many years, and he supported the creation of murals in the Mission District.

Death
Rodriguez died at his home in San Francisco on November 28, 2012, after battling cancer for six years.

Awards
In July 2013, during the San Diego Comic-Con, Rodriguez was one of six inductees into the Will Eisner Hall of Fame. The award was presented posthumously by Mad magazine cartoonist and Groo the Wanderer creator Sergio Aragonés. The other inductees were Lee Falk, Al Jaffee, Mort Meskin, Joe Sinnott, and Trina Robbins.

Exhibitions 
 1988 (June 27–August 10) Galería Esquina de la Libertad (San Francisco) — "Spain : a View from the Bottom: Posters, Comic Strips, Caricatures and More" 
 2012 (September 14, 2012–January 13, 2013) Burchfield Penney Art Center at Buffalo State College (Buffalo, NY) — "Spain: Rock, Roll, Rumbles, Rebels & Revolution"

Bibliography
 Subvert Comics #1–2 (Rip Off Press, 1970–1972); #3 (Saving Grace, 1976)
 Mean Bitch Thrills (Print Mint, Sept. 1971)
 Food Price Blackmail: Who's Behind the High Cost of Eating, text by Margaret Lobenstein & John Schommer. United Front Press, 1973.
 Trashman Lives!: The Collected Stories from 1968 to 1985 (Fantagraphics, 1989).
 She: Anthology of Big Bitch (with Susie Bright). San Francisco: Last Gasp, 1993.
 My True Story. Seattle: Fantagraphics Books, 1994.
 Nothing in This Book Is True, But It's Exactly How Things Are, text by Bob Frissell. Berkeley: Frog Ltd., 1994.
 Alien Apocalypse 2006 (with Kathy Glass and Harold S. Robbins). Berkeley: Frog Ltd., 2000.
 Sherlock Holmes' Strangest Cases by Sir Arthur Conan Doyle.  San Francisco: Word Play Publications, 2001.
 Nightmare Alley by William Lindsay Gresham. Seattle: Fantagraphics Books, 2003. 
 You Are a Spiritual Being Having a Human Experience, text by Bob Frissell. Berkeley: Frog Ltd., 2003.
 Che: A Graphic Biography, edited by Paul Buhle. London/New York: Verso, 2008.
 Devil Dog: the Amazing True Story of the Man Who Saved America, text by David Talbot. Simon & Schuster, 2010.
 Cruisin' with the Hound (Fantagraphics Books, 2012).
 Farmworker Comix: a History of the Farm Labor Struggle in California, text by Bill Morgan. (California Federation of Teachers, 2014).
 Dies Irae: One Man Against the American Empire (A Graphic Story of 9/11), text by Wolcott Wheeler. Independently Published, 2003,2018.

References

Notes

Sources 
 Ascher, Jon. "Sifting Through the Trash: Spain and Trashman," JonAscher.com (1998).
 Hodler, Tim. "Spain Rodriguez: Tributes," The Comics Journal (NOV 29, 2012).
 Talbot, David. "Death of an American original: Cartoonist Spain Rodriguez subverted the youth of America," Salon (DEC. 1, 2012).
 Vallen, Mark. "Trashman Lives!" Art for a Change website (Dec. 5, 2012).
 Viglietta, Sal. "Road Vultures and Rumbles," Artvoice Weekly Editionvol. 8, #42 (Oct. 14, 2009).

External links

 Cartoonist Tributes to Spain
 Spain Rodriguez Fought the Good Fight, Comics Journal website
 New York Times obituary
 "SPAIN: ROCK, ROLL, RUMBLES, REBELS, & REVOLUTION" exhibition, Burchfield Penney Art Center website
 A Salute to Spain by Ed Sanders
 Spain Rodriguez (1940-2012) by Paul Buhle

1940 births
American cartoonists
American comics artists
American erotic artists
Artists from Buffalo, New York
Underground cartoonists
2012 deaths
Deaths from cancer in California
Artists from San Francisco
American Splendor artists